This is a list of notable Christians from Cornwall, a county of England, in the United Kingdom.

Medieval
 A reputed King of Cornwall named Constantine was venerated in Cornwall as a saint, one of several saints named Constantine known in the Celtic church
 St Corentin, missionary to Brittany
John of Cornwall, medieval scholar
 St Petroc, a patron saint of Cornwall and of Devon
 St Piran, a patron saint of Cornwall and tin miners
 Michael Tregury, Archbishop of Dublin from 1450 to 1471 and chaplain to Henry VI
 John Trevisa, clergyman and scholar (Middle Ages)
 Thomas Vyvyan (or Vivian), prior of Bodmin and bishop of Megara (Tudor period)

Modern (post-Reformation)
 Thomas Ball Barratt, Norwegian pastor and one of the founding figures of the Pentecostal movement in Europe 
 William Borlase, clergyman, antiquary and naturalist
 William Trewartha Bray, Bible Christian preacher
 William Carvosso, Wesleyan Methodist
 Jack Clemo, blind poet and author from the china clay country 
 John William Colenso, bishop of Natal and Zulu advocate
 William Colenso, missionary, botanist, politician, and cousin of John William Colenso
 Blessed John Cornelius, Catholic priest and Jesuit, beatified in 1929
 Gilbert Hunter Doble, Anglican clergyman and scholar
 Samuel Drew, Methodist theologian
 George Grenfell, missionary
 Venerable John Hambley (died 1587), English Catholic and martyr
 Thomas Haweis, Church of England minister who was a leading figure in the 18th century evangelical revival 
 Silas Hocking, author and preacher
 Joseph Hull (1596-1665), rector at Launceston and St Buryan; controversial New England emigrant
 Joseph Hunkin, Bishop of Truro 
 W. S. Lach-Szyrma, clergyman and scholar
 George Martin, Anglican priest; known as "the modern St Anthony"
 Henry Martyn, Anglican missionary to India
 William O’Bryan, founder of the Bible Christian denomination of Methodism
 John Pendarves, Puritan minister and controversialist
 Catherine Payton Phillips, Quaker minister
Colin Podmore, ecclesiastical historian and Anglican official 
 Sam Pollard, missionary and inventor of the Pollard script
 Gerald Priestland, writer and broadcaster
 Paul Robins, Bible Christian minister who emigrated to Canada
 John Rogers, biblical scholar, clergyman, geologist & botanist
 Robert Terrill Rundle, Wesleyan Methodist missionary to Canada
 Richard Rutt, Anglican bishop and Cornish bard
 Samuel Prideaux Tregelles, Biblical scholar
 Jonathan Trelawny, Anglican bishop and antagonist of James II
 Bernard Walke, Anglo-Catholic priest and author of radio plays
 John Whitaker, clergyman and scholar

Gallery

See also

 Bishop of Cornwall
 Bishop of Truro
 Bishop of St Germans
 List of Cornish saints

References

Christians
Christians
 Christians